Waterloo Mills Historic District, also known as Cabbage Town, is a national historic district located in Easttown Township, Chester County, Pennsylvania. It encompasses 11 contributing buildings, 1 contributing site, and 3 contributing structures in the crossroads village of Waterloo Mills. Most date to the 19th century, and are primarily built of rubble fieldstone.  They include the Davis / Gallagher farmhouse (c. 1800), the Waterloo Mill (1796-1798), the wheelwright / blacksmith shop (1891), three residences (1804, c. 1820, and c. 1830), a dairy barn (c. 1890), and several outbuildings.  The district properties are owned by a single owner, who placed most of the land under protective easement in 1993.

It was listed on the National Register of Historic Places in 1995.

References

Historic districts on the National Register of Historic Places in Pennsylvania
Historic districts in Chester County, Pennsylvania
National Register of Historic Places in Chester County, Pennsylvania
Blacksmith shops